William Charles Harvey (10 October 1926 – 6 September 1957) was an Australian rules footballer who played with North Melbourne in the Victorian Football League (VFL).

Family
He was the grandfather of North Melbourne games record holder Brent Harvey.

Football

North Melbourne (VFL)
In his two seasons with North Melbourne (1948–1949), although a regular player in the Second XVIII, he only played in two senior matches, against Collingwood and Footscray in the 1948 season.

Heidelberg (DVFL)
He then played in the Diamond Valley Football League for the Heidelberg Football Club. He was the league's leading goal-kicker in 1950, with 102 goals.

Preston (VFA)
In 1951 he joined Preston in the VFA.

Fitzroy (VFL)
On 17 April 1953 he was cleared from Preston to Fitzroy. He played with the Second XVIII.

Preston (VFA)
Having failed to play First XVIII football with Fitzroy, he returned to Preston in 1954.

Footnotes

References
 
 World War Two Nominal Roll: Aitcraftsman William Charles Harvey (158050), Department of Veterans' Affairs.

External links
 
 
 William C. "Bill" Harvey, at The VFA Project.

1926 births
Australian rules footballers from Melbourne
North Melbourne Football Club players
Heidelberg Football Club players
Preston Football Club (VFA) players
1957 deaths
People from Mordialloc, Victoria